The women's individual pursuit at the 2008 Summer Paralympics took place on 9–10 September at the Laoshan Velodrome.

Classification
The cyclists are given a classification depending on the type and extent of their disability. The classification system allows cyclists to compete against others with a similar level of function.

Cycling classes:
B&VI 1–3: Blind and visually impaired cyclists.
LC 1–4: Cyclists with a locomotor disability.
CP 1–4: Cyclists with cerebral palsy.

B&VI 1–3 

The women's individual pursuit (B&VI 1–3) event took place on 9 September at the Laoshan Velodrome.

Preliminaries 

Q = Qualifier

LC 1–2/CP 4 

The women's individual pursuit (LC 1–2/CP 4) event took place on 10 September at the Laoshan Velodrome.

Preliminaries 

Q = Qualifier
WR = World Record

LC 3–4/CP 3 

The women's individual pursuit (LC 3–4/CP 3) event took place on 10 September at the Laoshan Velodrome.

Preliminaries 

Q = Qualifier
WR = World Record

References 

Women's individual pursuit
Para